The Golden Shears International Shearing and Woolhandling Championships is the world's most prestigious sheep shearing event.

It was founded in Masterton, New Zealand, and been held in the town's War Memorial Stadium each March since 1961.
It initially comprised competition in three shearing classes, including the Open championship, which is the most revered of all single shearing titles worldwide. In the final, sometimes referred to as shearing's equivalent of the Wimbledon Open in tennis, six shearers each shear 20 second-shear sheep, for which the fastest time was 15min 27.4sec, shorn in 2003.

But the competition is about more than just the fastest time, and the winner is decided on time and quality penalty points, the winner being the shearer with the lowest score.

Other events have expanded the programme over the years, with competition now held in five shearing classes, four woolhandling classes and three woolpressing classes, along with other events.

The McSkimming Memorial Triple Crown final was added to the programme in 1973, and in various sponsorship guises has become the unofficial New Zealand multiwools national championship. Currently known as the PGG Wrightson National Circuit, it is shorn in five qualifying stages in which points are accrued for shearing finewooled merino sheep, fullwooled strongwool sheep, coarse-wooled Corriedales, lambs and second-shear sheep. In the final, six competitors shear three of each type.

The Golden Shears in Masterton spawned Golden Shears championships in other countries, including the United Kingdom, where a Golden Shears of Great Britain was held at the Royal Bath and West Show, and Australia, which became involved in an annual home-and-away transtasman test series, staged alternately at Masterton, and at Euroa, Vic. Suspended for some years after industrial disturbances in Australia, the Australian legs of the series are now held at differing venues in conjunction with the Australisan national championships.

While machine shearing contests have been held at least since 1902, when an event was held at the Hawke's Bay A and P Show, Hastings, New Zealand, the Golden Shears is credited with the spread of shearing as a world-wide sport, including a Golden Shears World Championships, held first in England in 1977.

Despite the advent of a World Championships every 2–4 years, the Golden Shears in Masterton every year remains the mecca for sheep shearers worldwide, and entries in all classes have in peak years exceeded 600.

The Golden Shears World Shearing & Wool Handling Championships is a global competition featuring over 30 countries.

New Zealander David Fagan holds the most titles (16), won between 1986 and 2009, including 12 consecutive titles between 1990 and 2001.
The championships have been held in Masterton's War Memorial Stadium each March for 60 years consecutively, but were not held in 2021 and 2022 because of the lockdowns and border restrictions in the global pandemic.

Open Championship winners

1961 Ivan Bowen
1962 Bing MacDonald
1963 Brian Waterson
1964 Stewart Symon
1965 Snow Quinn
1966 Bing Macdonald
1967 Snow Quinn
1968 Snow Quinn
1969 George Potae
1970 Snow Quinn
1971 Snow Queen
1972 Snow Quinn
1973 Eddie Reidy
1974 Norm Blackwell
1975 Norm Blackwell
1976 Tom Brough
1977 Roger Cox
1978 Roger Cox
1979 Martin Nagasaki
1980 Roger Cox
1981 Ivan Rosandich
1982 Colin King
1983 Alan Donaldson
1984 John Fagan
1985 Paul Grainger
1986 David Fagan
1987 Colin King
1988 Colin King
1989 Edsel Forde
1990 David Fagan
1991 David Fagan
1992 David Fagan
1993 David Fagan
1994 David Fagan
1995 David Fagan
1996 David Fagan
1997 David Fagan
1998 David Fagan
1999 David Fagan
2000 David Fagan
2001 David Fagan
2002 John Kirkpatrick
2003 David Fagan
2004 David Fagan
2005 Paul Avery
2006 Dion King
2007 Paul Avery
2008 John Kirkpatrick
2009 David Fagan
2010 Cam Ferguson
2011 John Kirkpatrick
2012 John Kirkpatrick
2013 Rowland Smith
2014 Rowland Smith
2015 Gavin Mutch
2016 Rowland Smith
2017 Rowland Smith
2018 Rowland Smith
2019 Rowland Smith
2020 Rowland Smith
2021 Not held
2022 Milan Cooper

Notes

External links
 http://www.goldenshears.co.nz
 http://www.nzhistory.net.nz/first-golden-shears-competition
 http://www.worldshearingchamps.com

Masterton
Sheep shearing
Sports competitions in New Zealand
Sport in the Wellington Region
Sheep farming in New Zealand
Recurring sporting events established in 1961
Autumn events in New Zealand